Jiří Poděbradský (born 9 September 1982) is a Czech football defender. He currently plays for Hradec Králové in the Gambrinus liga.

References

External links 
 Profile at Hradec Králové website
 Profile at FKSokolov.cz

1982 births
Living people
Czech footballers
Czech First League players
FC Hradec Králové players
FK Baník Sokolov players
Association football defenders
People from Nová Paka
Sportspeople from the Hradec Králové Region